The National University of Ireland, Maynooth (NUIM), commonly known as Maynooth University (MU), is a constituent university of the National University of Ireland in Maynooth, County Kildare, Ireland. It was Ireland's youngest university until Technological University Dublin was established in 2019, having been founded by the Universities Act, 1997, from the secular faculties of the now separate St Patrick's College, Maynooth, which was founded in 1795. Maynooth is also the only university town in Ireland, all other universities being based within cities.

The university consists of two connected campuses: an older southern campus, with 19th-century buildings, shared with St Patrick's College, and, across a public road, a modern northern campus, occupying circa .

With over 13,000 students enrolled, and over 900 staff from over 20 different countries, it is Ireland's smallest, yet fastest growing, university. In 2009, Maynooth University was listed as a Top500 university in the Times Higher Education-QS World University Rankings. The 2012 QS World University Rankings put MU in the 501–550 bracket worldwide, but most recently, Maynooth University was ranked in the 701–750 bracket in the 2019 QS World University Rankings. In 2008, it was named The Sunday Times 'University of the Year'. In 2011, Maynooth University became the first and only institution outside of North America to be included in The Princeton Review of Best Colleges. It also has the highest proportion of university participation in Ireland of mature students (16%) and access students (22%).

History

18th and 19th centuries 

The university and St Patrick's College, Maynooth have a common history from 1795 to 1997. The college in Maynooth was established by the government as a college for Catholic lay and ecclesiastical students in 1795. The lay college was based from 1802 in Riverstown House on the south campus. With the opening of Clongowes Wood, the lay college which had lay trustees was closed in 1817 and it functioned solely as a Catholic seminary for almost 150 years. In 1876 the college became a constituent college of the Catholic University of Ireland, and later offered Royal University of Ireland degrees in arts and science. The Pontifical Charter was granted to the college in 1896.

20th and 21st centuries 
The college became a recognised constituent college of the National University of Ireland in 1910. From this time, arts and science degrees were awarded by the National University of Ireland, while the Pontifical University of Maynooth continued to confer its own theology degrees, as these had been prohibited in the Royal University of Ireland, and continued to the National University of Ireland (its successor) until 1997.

In 1966 the college again allowed the entry of lay students; this greatly expanded the college and essentially set the foundation stone for Maynooth University. In 1997 the Universities Act resulted in the transfer of the faculties of arts, Celtic studies, philosophy and science of the recognised college of St Patrick's College to the new university. The university has also expanded into finance and engineering since its creation in 1997. In 2007 the university added business studies, followed by law in 2008.

Any person who was a student at St Patrick's College, Maynooth, and was conferred with a National University of Ireland degree prior to the creation of the university, is legally considered a graduate of Maynooth University.

In 1994, W. J. Smyth was appointed to the position of Master of St. Patrick's College Maynooth (NUI) and in 1997 he became president of MU. In 2004 W. J. Smyth was succeeded by John G. Hughes as president of Maynooth University. Thomas Collins was appointed interim president for 2010–2011, and Philip Nolan served in the role 2011–2021. On 1 October 2021, Finnish academic Eeva Leinonen became the first woman president of the institution.

Timeline 

 1518 – Garret Óg Fitzgerald, Earl of Kildare, founded the College of St Mary, in Maynooth
 1535 – College of St Mary confiscated as part of Henry VIII's religious reforms
 1795 – The Royal College of St Patrick established on 5 June 1795 (35 Geo III, cap. 21)
 1798 – United Irishmen Rebellion; out of 69 students, 18 were expelled for taking the Oath of the United Irishmen
 1800 – Act of Union 1800; transfer of Maynooth grant from Dublin to London; John Butler, 12th Baron Dunboyne died
 1800 – First ordinations from Maynooth
 1801 – First lay college suppressed
 1802 – Lay college opens in Riverstown Lodge
 1808 – Dunboyne Establishment case settled between Maynooth Trustees and Butler family
 1817 – Lay college closed
 1845 – Maynooth grant increased
 1876 – Maynooth becomes a constituent college of the Catholic University of Ireland
 1886 – Disestablishment of the Church of Ireland by the government of Gladstone; Maynooth was disendowed and lay trustees left the board
 1880 – Royal University of Ireland founded
 1895 – Centennial celebrations
 1896 – Maynooth granted Pontifical University status by Papal Charter
 1903 – King Edward VII and Queen Alexandra visited it on 24 July 1903
 1908 – National University of Ireland founded
 1909 – Royal University of Ireland dissolved
1910 – St. Patricks College, Maynooth officially becomes a recognised college of the National University of Ireland
 1937 – Department of Sociology founded
 1966 – Lay students admitted
 1970 – Dept. of Biology founded as part of the Faculty of Science
 1976 – Higher Education Central Applications Office (CAO) founded
 1979 – Pope John Paul II visits Maynooth
 1984 – The John Paul II Library is built 
 1987 – Dept. of Computer Science founded as part of the Faculty of Science
 1992 – BA in Finance commences
 1995 – Bi-centennial celebrations
 1996 – Third level fees abolished by the Irish Government
 1997 – National University of Ireland, Maynooth founded from the faculties of Science, Arts and Celtic studies of Maynooth College of the NUI; Outreach Campus at St. Kieran's College in Kilkenny founded
 1999 – Foundation of Dept. of Psychology
 2001 – Foundation of Dept. of Engineering. MA in Leadership course commences for officers in the Irish Defence Forces; joint delivery of programmes with the Defence Forces, in Leadership, Management, Engineering and Computing, up to and including Masters level
 2004 – Foundation of the Dept. of Media Studies by Professor Chris Morash, as part of the School of English, Media and Theatre Studies
 2007 – Marie Curie Laboratory for Membrane Proteins opens, as NUIM wins European Union Marie Curie "Transfer of Knowledge" funding
 2008 – Named Sunday Times University of the Year; university canteen burns down during open day.
 2009 – Foundation of Department of Law with Professor Sandeep Gopalan as the first head of department.
 2010 – Announced that Froebel College of Education will move to the university by 2013; formation of the School of Business; Professor John Hughes resigns presidency to take post at Bangor University.
 2012 – Extension to The John Paul II Library is completed 
 2014 – Rebranded as Maynooth University
 2018 – Kilkenny campus closed

Campus 

The university's main campus straddles the main road from Maynooth to Kilcock. It is divided into the North Campus and the South Campus (also referred to by staff and students as the "new" and "old" campuses respectively). The campuses were connected by means of a footbridge that crossed over the road until mid-2011. The footbridge was then decommissioned due to the construction of a library extension on the South Campus. The campuses are now connected by means of a pedestrian crossing on the Kilcock Road. The campus has four buildings for on-campus accommodation, namely Rye, Village, River, and Courtyard.

South Campus 

The South Campus houses the facilities of St. Patrick's College, as well as most of the administrative offices shared between college and university. A number of MU academic departments also have their offices on the South Campus including Law, Mathematics, Music, Geography, Economics and History. The main buildings, most of which were built in the 19th century, are the Aula Maxima; St. Patrick's House (including the college chapel); the John Paul II Library (built in 1984). In December 2012 a new extension to the John Paul II library was completed. The extension is 6,000m2 and accommodates 1,700 students. New, Dunboyne, Humanity and Stoyte Houses which collectively form St. Joseph's Square; Logic House and Rhetoric House.
The first building to be completed on the South Campus was named after its designer, John Stoyte. Stoyte House, still a prominent presence on campus, stands in proximity to Maynooth Castle.

Over a period of 15 years, the site at Maynooth underwent rapid construction so as to cater for the influx of new students, and the buildings which now border St. Joseph's Square (to the rear of Stoyte House) were completed by 1824. The university chapel is located on the South Campus, just off St. Joseph's Square; masses and choir services are frequently held in the chapel, as is the traditional Christmas carol service. The South Campus also houses the National Science Museum and the Russell Library.

North Campus 
The North Campus was developed far more recently than the South Campus, in the latter half of the 20th century. Here, the main buildings are the Students' Union building, Sports Complex, Biosciences, and Engineering Building, Callan Science Building (named after the inventor of the induction coil, Nicholas Callan), the Iontas Building, the Arts Building, the Science Building and the John Hume Building. The Eolas Building houses the department of Computer Science, the Business Incubation Centre, the Innovation Value Institute, as well as the Hamilton and Callan Institutes, along with several teaching spaces, while the Technology, Society and Innovation (TSI) Building houses living labs and break out rooms for interactive research; three large theatres of 500, 300 and 250-seat capacity, and research spaces for students, academics and collaboration with industry partners.

The student services function is also based on North Campus, and there are a number of playing fields and a sports complex, which includes a fully equipped gym and an astroturf field. The remainder of MU's academic departments, as well as many research institutes such as the Institute of Microelectronics and Wireless Systems, the Hamilton Institute and the Institute of Immunology, are also located on the North Campus.

Kilkenny Campus 
The university also maintained a campus in Kilkenny from September 1997 until June 2018, based at St Kieran's College, with students enrolled in certificate, diploma and degree programmes.

Academic organisation and reputation 

The university is divided into three faculties: Arts, Celtic Studies and Philosophy; Science and Engineering; Social Sciences, with most students studying within one of these streams (although some cross-discipline courses are available). The faculties are further divided into various schools and departments.

As of 2016, there were 1,800 students at post graduate level. Some postgraduate students also have links to the various research institutes that are based on campus.

Froebel College of Education became part of Maynooth University in September 2013. A new optional subject available to first years, called critical skills.

Faculties, schools, departments and centres

Froebel College of Education 
Since 2013, Froebel College of Education is situated at MU. Maynooth University has established a "Froebel Department of Early Childhood and Primary Education" and awarded Froebel College's four-year Bachelor of Education degrees, Higher Diploma in Primary Education, Master's degree in Special and Inclusive Education and Postgraduate Diploma in Arts in Special Education. The state-of-the-art Education Building opened in late September 2016.

As a continuity of Froebel Colleges' heritage Religious Education and Theology modules are delivered by the department and the faculty of Theology of St Patrick's College, Maynooth (SPCM), running alongside the Degree and Masters programmes, leading to a Certificate awarded by SPCM and qualifying to teach in Catholic Schools.

Admissions 
Admission to undergraduate study for European Union school-leavers is generally handled by the CAO (Central Applications Office), and not by MU. Applicants have to compete for university places solely on the basis of the results of their school-leaving exams. Places are awarded in mid-August every year by the CAO after matching the number of places available to the academic attainments of the applicants. Qualifications are measured as "points", with specific scales for the Irish Leaving Certificate, and all other European Union school-leaving results, such as the UK GCE A-level, the International Baccalaureate along with other national school-leaving exams.

Academic affiliations 
Maynooth University is a member of Universities Ireland, The Irish Universities Association, European University Association, European Association for International Education and Eurodoc.
MU is also a member of Dublin Region Higher Education Alliance, along with three other universities; TCD, UCD, DCU, and four institutes of technology; DIT, IADT, ITT and ITB. Maynooth University is also a member of the 3U Partnership with Dublin City University and the Royal College of Surgeons Ireland.

The L.L.M. in International Business Law is offered as a dual degree offered in conjunction with the Catholic University of Lyon (UCLy) in France, the course is delivered in English.

The Development Studies programmes of the Kimmage Development Studies Centre, began being delivered from Maynooth and accredited by the university in 2013, with the Centre moving from Kimmage Manor to Maynooth in 2018.

The Diploma in Arts (Church Music) delivered in association with the National Liturgy Institute (St. Patrick's College, Maynooth) and the Dept. of Music NUI Maynooth.

Any student of St Patrick's College, Maynooth prior to the passing of the Universities Act, 1997, upon whom a degree of the National University of Ireland was conferred is now legally considered to be a graduate of Maynooth University. The college continues to share its campus with Maynooth University but remains a separate legal entity with training in canon law, philosophy and theology and awards the degrees of the Pontifical University and is associated with several other colleges.

Reputation 
In 2008, Maynooth University occupied fourth place on the Irish Sunday Times University League Table 2008, the newspaper's annual league table of Irish third-level institutions, behind TCD, UCD and UCC, having jumped three places since 2007. It was also the top institution for research income won per academic, with one of the best graduate employment records of any Irish university at almost 100 percent. MU was also named "University of The Year 2008" in The Sunday Times University Guide (UK), beating UCD which finished second.

In 2009, Maynooth University was listed as a Top500 university in the Times Higher Education-QS World University Rankings.

In 2010, MU recorded the highest growth in first preference school-leaver applications in the university sector.

In 2011, Maynooth University became the first and only institution outside of the United States to be included in the Princeton Review of Best Colleges.

Maynooth University was recently ranked No. 49 in the world for one of the leading universities in the world.

Academic competition 
St Patrick's College (NUI) won the inaugural University Challenge based Irish Higher Education Quiz show on RTÉ, Challenging Times in 1991, winning again in 1992 and as MU in 1999.

Maynooth University and University of Newcastle, Australia's joint robotic soccer team "Numanoids" won the soccer Standard Platform League (2-Legged Robot) RoboCup World Championship which was held in Suzhou, China from 14 to 20 July 2008. 2008 was Maynooth University's first year to enter the international robot competition which hosted 440 teams from 35 countries.

Maynooth University first entered the Microsoft Imagine Cup in 2007. it achieved both first and third place in the Imagine Cup Ireland finals, earning participation in the world finals in Seoul, South Korea in August 2007. Team inGEST (Interactive Gesture), who developed a low-cost interactive system for teaching sign language using standard web cameras for feedback, achieved a top-six position in the finals and went on to Silicon Valley in February 2008 as part of the Imagine Cup Innovation Accelerator Program. In 2008, students tied for second place in the Microsoft Imagine Cup in the category of "Embedded Development". A total of 124 teams representing 61 countries and regions took part in 2008. In 2010 the university won the award for Best Windows Azure Application with their cloud-based medical record system.

Coat of Arms 

The coat of arms, which were granted by the Chief Herald of Ireland in 2016, are blazoned: Argent an open book leaved and bound proper clasped or a chief gyrony of six of the field and gules on a point in point of the last a cross pattée fitchy at all points of the first.

The book represents a place of universal learning, the cross the university's links to the seminary, the division of the chief into six representing its six disciplines, and the use of red and white is reminiscent of the FitzGerald dynasty's links to Maynooth. The university does not currently use its coat of arms, preferring to use the logo which was introduced in 2014.

Research and innovation 
A number of research institutes fall under the auspices of Maynooth University:

 Irish Climate Analysis and Research Units (ICARUS) – Established in order to improve scientific understanding of climate change and its impacts
 Institute of Immunology
 Hamilton Institute
 National Institute for Regional and Spatial Analysis  – Based at Maynooth University, NIRSA is a collaborative project involving Mary Immaculate College, Limerick, Institute of Technology, Sligo and Queen's University, Belfast
 The Callan Institute (formerly Institute of Microelectronics and Wireless Systems) – Provides for research into electronic and software systems and wireless communications.
 National Centre for Geocomputation –  Leading international research centre in the field of Geocomputation
 An Foras Feasa – The Institute for Research in Irish Historical and Cultural Traditions
 Innovation Value Institute (IVI) – a joint research institute founded by Maynooth University and Intel which was "awarded to Maynooth University in 2006 over Massachusetts Institute of Technology"
 Maynooth University is involved in research at the CTVR Telecommunications Research Centre, based at Trinity College Dublin.

Spin-out companies 
 Beemune
 IGeotech

Student life and traditions 
Maynooth Students' Union represents the students of Maynooth University, St. Patrick's College, Maynooth as well as students at its associated campus at St Kieran's College.

Student Clubs 

There are currently over 100 clubs and societies in Maynooth University. Clubs on campus include those for rugby, Gaelic football, hurling & camogie, judo, ultimate Frisbee, Aussie Rules, badminton, swimming, kickboxing, tennis, archery, trampolining, surfing, canoeing and kayaking ('MUCK'), golf, skiing, parkour & free running, hockey, strength & fitness, aquatics, Olympic handball, snooker and pool, ultimate frisbee, chess, surf, judo, ladies soccer, rowing, self-defence and equestrian. Most of the university clubs take part in an intervarsity competition to some degree. Maynooth University also participates in an annual intervarsity sporting competition with Dublin City University, known as the 35s.

Sporting scholarships 
The university offers a number of sport scholarships to aspiring students in Gaelic games, rugby, golf, swimming, Soccer and snooker. Maynooth is the only university in Ireland to offer scholarships in swimming. Rugby scholarships were introduced to Maynooth University in 2006 in which scholarship students are obliged to attend the rugby performance centre and to play with the university teams and Barnhall RFC. The Maynooth University Rugby Performance Centre is open to all Rugby Club members attending MU. The aim of the centre is to enhance students' prospects within the game of rugby and to continue to achieve success with the university teams. As part of the link-up with Barnhall RFC, players from the youth system 16–20s are invited to take part in a summer programme. Currently, there are 4 men's teams playing in Barnhall rugby club as well as the introduction of the women's Rugby scholarship there is now a women's rugby team in Barnhall.

Recent accolades

Student numbers 
2016/17

Student demographics 
2016/17

Staff numbers 
2016/17

Student societies 

There is a colourful history of drama and theatre at Maynooth University, which can be traced back to eminent alumni such as Brian Friel (1948) and faculty such as internationally renowned playwright Frank McGuinness. Students of the university and St Patrick's College take part in various dramatic productions throughout the year, ranging from tragedy to comedy, melodrama, farce and improv. The Maynooth University Drama Society annually confers the Eugene Niland Spirit of Drama Award on a recipient who demonstrates an extraordinary level of dedication to the craft of theatre, complete with a display of integrity and honorable principles in the practice thereof.  The Drama Society won Best Society at the Students Union Clubs and Socs Awards 2006 and again in 2007 and the Society's Improvisation Team won the 2009 Irish Student Drama Association Improv event.

Each year the Games Society at Maynooth holds their annual gaming convention, 'Dominicon'. The event was first held in 1995 and has been run each year since then with the exception of 1999. Originally it was run during February each year but the date was eventually moved to November. The Games Society donates all profits from the convention to charity.

MarsFM is the student radio station of Maynooth University and is run by the broadcasting society. The first broadcast was aired in semester one of 2013 and now has over 120 presenters. it goes on air every November until the end of the school year.

Other societies include those for music, dance, musical (MAD) LGBTQ, biology, poetry, art ("Playdo"), fashion ("StyleSoc"), Feminist Soc, Tea Society, mathematics, Israel, Justice in Palestine, literature and debating ("Lit & Deb"), Maynooth Students' SVP – St Vincent de Paul Society, French language society, Spanish language society, Irish language society, (Cuallacht na Gaeilge) History Society, Afro Caribbean Society, Chinese Society, Chemistry Society, Christian Society, John Paul II Society, Psychology society as well as political societies such as Sinn Féin, Young Fine Gael, Ógra Fianna Fáil, Labour Youth, Social Democrats and a Socialist Society (which includes Socialist Party, Socialist Workers Party and non-affiliated members).

The Dance Society was awarded 1st place at the 2016 Intervarsity Dance Competition at Trinity College for their lyrical performance and 2nd place for their mixed routine, involving lyrical, jazz, hip hop, and Irish dance.

BICS awards 
Maynooth University annually compete for university/college society awards at a national level, which are organised by the Board of Irish College Societies (BICS).

Awards

Traditions

35s 
In addition to individual clubs' intervarsity competitions, Maynooth University has a standing intervarsity competition with Dublin City University (DCU) each year called the 35s, in which the two colleges compete as a whole. Each club faces their counterpart in DCU, the winning university being whichever takes most points out of the 35 available over all sports.

Christmas Carol service
A Christmas Carol service is held in the college chapel on an annual basis. The service is open to staff and students of the university and St Patrick's College, as well as members of the general public. Because of high demand, tickets are allocated by lottery.

Hamilton Walk
In 1990 the Dept. of Mathematics, at St. Patrick's College, Maynooth, initiated by Professor O'Farrell, commenced an annual walk from Dunsink Observatory, to Broombridge, Cabra, to commemorate the mathematician William Rowan Hamilton. Initially called The Quaternion Walk, now called The Hamilton Walk, takes place in October each year.

Maynooth Alumni Association
The Maynooth Alumni Association is for graduates of Maynooth University and St Patricks College, Maynooth, who wish to keep in touch with their College and also provides the means to stay in touch with friends and classmates. It hosts a number of events such as the Alumni Ball, Networking events, and publishes the Alumni magazine The Bridge.

Accommodation on Campus 
There are four different halls of residence available on campus, located on the North Campus. These are Rye Hall, Village, River, and the Courtyard Apartment Complex. In River there is an Irish language accommodation; An Ghráig. All of the apartments are open plan with a fully equipped kitchen including microwave, oven, fridge & kettle Prices currently range from €4,900 per year for a single room with a shared bathroom to €6,370 a year for a single room with an ensuite bathroom. Maynooth University also offers Short Stay Accommodation for students who only require a room for a short period.

Notable alumni and faculty

Nobel laureates and contributors
 John Hume, graduate, politician, activist, Nobel laureate and winner of the Sean Mc Bride Peace Award. MP for Foyle and leader of the Social Democratic and Labour Party 1979–2001.

Government, politics, law and public policy 
 Former Taoiseach Bertie Ahern, appointed Honorary Adjunct Professor of Mediation and Conflict Intervention in the School of Business and Law
 Ruth Coppinger HDipEd, Socialist TD (Dublin West) 2014-2020
 Joe Costello, TD (Dublin Central)
 Noel Dempsey, TD and Cabinet Minister
 Éamon de Valera, President of Ireland, lectured in Mathematics and Mathematical Physics at Maynooth in 1912 
 John Blake Dillon the Irish nationalist, Young Ireland member, who co-founded The Nation newspaper and spent two years in Maynooth
 Paddy Gormley Nationalist Member of the Northern Ireland parliament.
 Mary Hanafin TD, Former Minister for Social and Family Affairs (BA, HdipEd)
 Brian Hayes, TD (Dublin South West)
 Joe McHugh, TD (Donegal North East)
Catherine Martin, Minister for Tourism, Culture, Arts, Gaeltacht, Sport and Media
John O'Brennan, political scientist
 Maureen O'Brien (Irish Army general), first woman to attain the ranks of Lt Colonel (Army line), Colonel and Brigadier General in the Irish Defence Forces
 Kevin O'Higgins, MP, TD
 Mary O'Rourke, Former TD, Sen. (BA, HdipEd)
 Joe O'Toole(HdipEd), former president of the Irish Congress of Trade Unions (ICTU) and Independent NUI senator
 Richard Lalor Sheil MP, and playwright, an associate of Daniel O'Connell and a founder of the Catholic Association attended the lay college in Maynooth, and strongly spoke in favour of the Maynooth Grant.
 Stephen Woulfe who became a barrister, and Attorney General and the first catholic to be Chief Barron of the Irish Exchequer also attended the lay college at Maynooth.

Arts and the media 
 Concert promoter Jim Aiken
 Professional footballer Jake Carroll
 Broadcaster Craig Doyle
 Playwright and short story writer Brian Friel, who graduated with a BA in 1948
 Poet Denis Florence MacCarthy
 Playwright Frank McGuinness taught English in Maynooth
 Chris Morash, chair of the Broadcasting Authority of Ireland Compliance Committee was a professor of English, Media and Theatre Studies at NUI Maynooth
 Eurovision 1996 winner Eimear Quinn
 Former Miss Ireland Niamh Redmond is a graduate in finance
 PR Consultant, RTE former Board Chair Tom Savage BD BA.

Science, technology and academia 
 Dermot Barnes-Holmes, Professor of Psychology, is the world's most prolific author in the experimental analysis of behaviour for the years 1980–1999, and is noted for the development of Relational Frame Theory alongside Steven C. Hayes.
 Nicholas Callan, inventor of the induction coil, who was a student and Professor of Natural Philosophy (Physics) at Maynooth 
 Sir Dominic Corrigan Bart., MD, MP, physician, first Catholic president of the Royal College of Physicians, member of the Queen's Colleges Senate, Vice-Chancellor of the Queen's University in Ireland, and Liberal MP for Dublin City was student of the lay college in the early 19th century.
 Mathematician and Classical scholar Pádraig de Brún was Professor of Mathematics at Maynooth prior to becoming president of UCG (NUI Galway).
 Sir Joseph de Courcy Laffan physician to the Duke of Kent and Duke of York attended the early lay college in Maynooth.
 Christopher Fleming MD, former president of the Royal College of Surgeons
 John Hegarty, former Provost of Trinity College Dublin, holds both a BSc in Physics/Chemistry/Mathematics/Philosophy and a HDipEd from the National University of Ireland, Maynooth.
 Theologian and physicist Gerald Molloy
 Noted astronomer and physicist Susan McKenna-Lawlor, Professor of Experimental Physics.
 Professor Emeritus of Irish at National University of Ireland Galway Breandan O'Madagain
 Philosopher and professor at Princeton University, Philip Pettit
 Philosopher and former professor at University of Notre Dame Ernan McMullin
 Michael O'Dwyer was nominated Chevalier dans l'ordre des Palmes académiques, by French Prime Minister François Fillon
 Desmond Tobin, Professor of Dermatological Science at University College Dublin
 Peter Thorne is a climatologist and professor of physical geography in the Department of Geography and chair of the International Surface Temperature Initiative.

Theology 

 Cornelius Denvir, mathematician, natural philosopher, and Bishop
 John Blowick BA BD, theologian founder of the Maynooth Mission to China(Columban Fathers)
 Linda Hogan, theologian and ethicist, Professor at the Irish School of Ecumenics, Trinity College Dublin 
 Former president of Maynooth, and later Archbishop of Melbourne, Australia, Daniel Mannix 
 Gerald Molloy theologian and physicist.
 Msgr. Matthew O'Donnell, University of Louvain Professor of Ethics, 26th president of Maynooth College.
 Joseph S. O'Leary theologian, philosopher, English Literature Buddhist-Christian dialogue.

Honorary degree awardees 
 Golfer Pádraig Harrington
 Aga Khan head of the Ismaeli Muslim community
 Seán Quinn businessman and conglomerateur
 Barry Douglas (pianist) pianist
 Krzysztof Penderecki composer

Publications

Currently active 
 MU Times: Weekly online magazine. mutimes.ie
 University News: Quarterly bulletin
 ReSearch: Magazine detailing current research at the university
 The Bridge: Biannual alumni magazine produced by the Alumni Association.
 The Print: Monthly magazine published by the Maynooth Students' Union, featuring editorials, interviews, creative works and campus news
 The Golden Thread: Newsletter featuring editorials, comments and articles on current issues regarding the law department and the area of law in general
 The Irish Law Journal: Peer-reviewed and student-edited law journal
 Archivium Hibernicum: founded in 1911 is an annual historical journal published by St. Patrick's College, Maynooth, and the Dept. of Modern History, Maynooth University.
 Maynooth Philosophical Papers, a biennial journal founded in 2002 by Thomas A. F. Kelly and edited in the Department of Philosophy

Defunct 
 The Tonic / Maynooth Advocate: newspaper titles published by the Publications Society.
 The SUS / nuimsu.com / The Spoke: former newspaper & magazine titles published by the Students' Union (predecessors to The Print)

Gallery

See also 
 Education in the Republic of Ireland
 List of universities in the Republic of Ireland
 National University of Ireland
 St Patrick's College, Maynooth
 Royal University of Ireland
 Catholic University of Ireland

References

External links 
 Official site
 Students' Union

 
Maynooth
1795 establishments in Ireland
Universities and colleges formed by merger in the Republic of Ireland